Toa Payoh United is a soccer club in Singapore which plays outside the country's top-level S.League. The team won Singapore's President's Cup in 1977 and 1979.

References

 
Football clubs in Singapore